Wonga Philip Harris (June 24, 1904 – August 11, 1995) was an American actor, comedian, musician and songwriter. He was an orchestra leader and a pioneer in radio situation comedy, first with The Jack Benny Program, then in The Phil Harris-Alice Faye Show in which he co-starred with his wife, singer-actress Alice Faye, for eight years. Harris is also noted for his voice acting in animated films. As a voice actor, he played Baloo in The Jungle Book (1967), Thomas O'Malley in The Aristocats (1970), Little John in Robin Hood (1973), and Patou in Rock-a-Doodle (1991). As a singer, he recorded a #1 novelty hit record, "The Thing" (1950).

Early life and career 
Harris was born in Linton, Indiana, but grew up in Nashville, Tennessee, and identified himself as a Southerner. His hallmark song was "That's What I Like About the South." He had a trace of a Southern accent and in later years made self-deprecating jokes over the air about his heritage. His parents were circus performers. His father, a tent bandleader, gave him his first job as a drummer with the circus' band.

His unusual first name "Wonga," is said to derive from a Cherokee word meaning "messenger of fleet" or, perhaps more accurately translated, "fast messenger."

Harris began his music career as a drummer in San Francisco, in the mid-1920s playing drums in the Henry Halstead Big Band Orchestra. He formed an orchestra with Carol Lofner in the latter 1920s and started a long engagement at the St. Francis Hotel. In the 1930s, Lofner-Harris recorded swing music for Victor, Columbia, Decca, and Vocalion. The partnership ended by 1932, and Harris led a band in Los Angeles for which he was the singer and bandleader.

In 1933, he made a short film for RKO called So This Is Harris!, which won an Academy Award for best live action short subject. He followed with a feature-length film, Melody Cruise. Both films were created by the same team that produced Flying Down to Rio, which started the careers of Fred Astaire and Ginger Rogers. He also starred in I Love a Bandleader (1945) with Leslie Brooks. Here he played a house painter who gets amnesia, then starts to lead a band. He recorded Woodman, Spare That Tree (by George Pope Morris and Henry Russell) in 1947. His nickname was "Old Curly." In 1950, Harris recorded a hit novelty song entitled "The Thing," which did hit number 1 on the charts. Additionally, he appeared in The Wild Blue Yonder a.k.a. "Thunder Across the Pacific" (1951), alongside Forrest Tucker and Walter Brennan. He made a cameo appearance in the Warner Bros. musical, Starlift, with Janice Rule and Dick Wesson, and was featured in The High and the Mighty with John Wayne in 1954.

Radio
In 1936, Harris became musical director of The Jell-O Program Starring Jack Benny singing and leading his band, with Mahlon Merrick writing much of the show's music. When Harris exhibited a knack for snappy one-liners, he joined the cast, portraying himself as a hip, hard-drinking Southerner whose good nature superseded his ego. He gave the others nicknames, such as "Jackson" for Jack Benny. (Addressing a man as "Jackson" or sometimes "Mr. Jackson" became popular slang in the early 1940s.) His signature song was "That's What I Like About the South." Many of his vocal recordings were comic novelty "talking blues," similar to the songs of Bert Williams, which are sometimes considered a precursor to rap.

In 1942, Harris and his band joined the merchant marines, and they served for 16 weeks.

In 1946, Harris and wife Alice Faye began co-hosting The Fitch Bandwagon, a comedy-variety program that followed the Jack Benny show on Sunday nights. On The Fitch Bandwagon and its later incarnation as The Phil Harris-Alice Faye Show, Harris played a vain, stumbling husband, while Faye played his sarcastic but loving wife. Gerald Nachman has written that Harris was a soft-spoken, modest man off the air. In On the Air: The Encyclopedia of Old-Time Radio John Dunning wrote that Harris's character made the show popular. The Phil Harris-Alice Faye Show appeared until 1954. Harris continued to appear on Jack Benny's show from 1948 to 1952.

Recording career 
Harris was recording songs as early as 1931. Songs by Harris include the early 1950s novelty song, "The Thing". The song describes the hapless finder of a box with a mysterious secret and his efforts to rid himself of it.

Later career
In 1956, Harris appeared in the film Good-bye, My Lady. He made numerous guest appearances on 1960s and 1970s television series, including The Steve Allen Show, the Kraft Music Hall, Burke's Law, F Troop, The Dean Martin Show, The Hollywood Palace, and other musical variety programs. He appeared on The American Sportsman which took celebrities on hunting and fishing trips around the world.

Harris worked as a voice actor for animated films, providing the voice of Baloo the bear in The Jungle Book (1967), Thomas O'Malley in The Aristocats (1970), and Little John in Robin Hood (1973). In 1989, he reprised his role as Baloo for the cartoon series TaleSpin, but after a few recording sessions he was replaced by Ed Gilbert. Harris's final film role was in Rock-a-Doodle (1991).

Harris spent time in the 1970s and early 1980s leading a band that appeared often in Las Vegas, often on the same bill with bandleader Harry James.

Personal life 
On September 2, 1927, he married actress Marcia Ralston (then known as Mascotte Ralston) in Melbourne, Australia, where his band had a long engagement. The couple adopted a son, Phil Harris Jr. (born 1935). Harris and Marcia divorced in September 1940.

Harris and Alice Faye married in 1941; it was a second marriage for both (Faye had been married briefly to singer-actor Tony Martin) and lasted 54 years, until Harris's death. Harris engaged in a fistfight at the Trocadero nightclub in 1938 with RKO studio mogul Bob Stevens; the cause was reported to be over Faye after Stevens and Faye had ended a romantic relationship.

A Democrat, he supported the campaign of Adlai Stevenson during the 1952 presidential election.

Harris was a lifelong friend of singer and actor Bing Crosby.  He appeared on telecasts of Bing's Pro-Am Golf Tournament from Pebble Beach, California,  and appeared in an episode of ABC's short-lived sitcom The Bing Crosby Show. After Crosby died in 1977, Harris replaced him as commentator for the annual Bing Crosby Pro-Am Golf Tournament.

Harris was a resident and benefactor of Palm Springs, California, and was active in many local civic organizations.

Death and legacy
Harris died of a heart attack at age 91 in his Rancho Mirage home in the night of August 11, 1995. He is interred at Forest Lawn Cemetery, Cathedral City, California.

Harris was a benefactor of his birthplace of Linton, Indiana, establishing scholarships in his honor for promising high school students, performing at the high school, and hosting a celebrity golf tournament in his honor every year. Harris and Faye donated most of their show business memorabilia and papers to Linton's public library. Harris was inducted into the Indiana Hall of Fame.

In 1994, a Golden Palm Star on the Palm Springs Walk of Stars was dedicated to him.

Partial discography 
 The Thing. RCA, Victor. 1950.
 That's What I LIke About The South. RCA, Victor. 1947 20–2471.
 Loaded Pistol, Loaded Dice. RCA, Victor. 1947.
 Hambone. RCA, Victor. 1952. 47-4584.

 Harris starred as Baloo in the 1967 animated film The Jungle Book and sang the song "The Bare Necessities". He also performed with Louis Prima on the song "I Wanna Be Like You (The Monkey Song)".

Notes and references

Bibliography
 Steen, Ivan D. (2001). "Harris, (Wanga) Phillip ("Phil")." The Scribner Encyclopedia of American Lives. Charles Scribner's Sons. Retrieved January 9, 2013 from HighBeam Research

External links

 
 Phil Harris 1988 Interview with Chuck Schaden
 Phil Harris Interview NAMM Oral History Library (1985)
 

1904 births
1995 deaths
Male actors from Indiana
American bandleaders
American male comedians
American male film actors
American male radio actors
American male voice actors
American Protestants
Big band bandleaders
Burials at Forest Lawn Cemetery (Cathedral City)
California Democrats
Comedians from California
Disney people
Indiana Democrats
Male actors from Palm Springs, California
Male actors from Tennessee
Musicians from Nashville, Tennessee
Musicians from Palm Springs, California
People from Linton, Indiana
RCA Victor artists
Singers from Indiana
Tennessee Democrats
20th-century American comedians
20th-century American male actors
20th-century American male singers
20th-century American singers